World on Wheels was a roller rink in Los Angeles, California, United States. The rink opened in 1981, then closed in 2013. After reopening in 2017, it closed again in 2020.

The rink is featured in the HBO documentary film United Skates.

References

1981 establishments in California
Sports venues in Los Angeles
Roller skating rinks
2020 disestablishments in California